That's the Question is an American television game show hosted by Bob Goen based on the original game show of the same name that is aired in the Neatherlands. It premiered on Game Show Network October 2, 2006, airing for two seasons.

Gameplay
Two contestants compete in an attempt to answer questions by putting letters into a puzzle, similar to Hangman.

Each question has a set number of letters in it, and the letters in it are revealed through unscrambling clues. Each scrambled clue consists of a word or multiple words and one extra letter. The extra letter goes into the question after the answer to the clue is revealed.

The answer to the question is displayed under the question, and in order to correctly solve it, the contestant must give both the question and the answer.

Round one
The game begins with a toss-up question where the letters are revealed one at a time. The answer appeared below the question in the first season, but it did not during the second season. The first contestant to buzz in and correctly solve the question would play first in round one.

In round one, each question's answer is revealed to both contestants to start. Taking turns, beginning with the contestant that won the initial toss-up, letters are placed in the question one at a time using a randomizer that was stopped with the contestants' signaling devices. Correctly deciphering the scrambled word scored one point for each time the letter appeared in the question, if the contestant did not answer correctly, the letters were placed and nobody scored for that particular word.

Once a contestant felt he/she had enough information to solve, he/she would say "I know the question" and then be prompted to do so. Five points were awarded for correctly solving a question.

Round two
In the second round, the points doubled. Each letter placed in the question was now worth two points and correctly solving the question scored ten. The differences were that a correct answer to a scrambled word allowed a contestant to keep control and the solution to the question was not displayed when a question was first revealed, instead the letters were filled in as the round progressed (no points were scored for revealing them, however).

The contestant with the highest score at the end of round two won the game and $500.

Bonus round
The day's winner received an opportunity to increase their winnings to $5,000 by correctly solving one final question.

The champion's point total from the main game was converted into seconds and that became his/her allotted time for the round. Once again, letters were placed in the question by correctly unscrambling words. However, the letters could only be placed with a correct answer, this meant that multiple scrambled words with the same extra letter would be played until the champion correctly answered.

Once the champion's time ran out, he/she was given ten additional seconds to try and correctly solve both the question and the answer, the latter of which was never revealed until the end of the bonus round. If the champion started to answer before the ten seconds expired, he/she was allowed to finish.

Correctly solving both the question and the answer before the ten second time limit expired increased the champion’s winnings to $5,000.

Production
That's the Question was green-lit by Game Show Network (GSN) on September 11, 2006. The series was hosted by Bob Goen and premiered on October 2, 2006. An online interactive game was also produced for GSN's website.

References

Bibliography

External links

2000s American game shows
2006 American television series debuts
2007 American television series endings
English-language television shows
Game Show Network original programming